A list of books and essays about Stanley Kubrick and his films:

Biographies and interviews

General

Books on individual films

2001 A Space Odyssey

A Clockwork Orange

Eyes Wide Shut

Full Metal Jacket

Lolita

Music

Photographs

Documentary
 Stanley Kubrick: A Life in Pictures. Documentary film. Dir. Jan Harlan. Warner Home Video, 2001. 142 min.

Kubrick, Stanley
Bibliography